Ahed Joughili (born October 10, 1984) is a Syrian weightlifter, who competed in the 105 kg division at the 2008 Summer Olympics and 2012 Summer Olympics. Joughili won a silver medal at the 2005 Mediterranean Games and a gold medal at the 2006 Asian Games. Joughili claimed both gold medals for the 105 kg snatch and clean&jerk at the 2009 Mediterranean Games.

References

1984 births
Living people
Syrian male weightlifters
Olympic weightlifters of Syria
Weightlifters at the 2008 Summer Olympics
Weightlifters at the 2012 Summer Olympics
Asian Games medalists in weightlifting
Weightlifters at the 2006 Asian Games
Weightlifters at the 2010 Asian Games
Weightlifters at the 2014 Asian Games
Asian Games gold medalists for Syria
Mediterranean Games gold medalists for Syria
Mediterranean Games silver medalists for Syria
Mediterranean Games bronze medalists for Syria
Competitors at the 2005 Mediterranean Games
Competitors at the 2009 Mediterranean Games
Competitors at the 2013 Mediterranean Games
Medalists at the 2006 Asian Games
Mediterranean Games medalists in weightlifting
People from Hama
21st-century Syrian people